James Edmund Bailey (August 15, 1822December 29, 1885) was an American Democratic United States Senator from Tennessee from 1877 to 1881.

Early life and education 
Bailey was born in Montgomery County, Tennessee.  He attended the Clarksville Academy and the former University of Nashville.

Career 
He then studied law and was admitted to the bar in 1843, starting a practice in Clarksville, Tennessee.  In 1853, he was elected to the Tennessee House of Representatives as a Whig.

During the Civil War, he served in the 49th Tennessee Regiment, Confederate States Army as a colonel.

He was appointed by governor of Tennessee John C. Brown to the Court of Arbitration in 1874.

Bailey was elected by the Tennessee General Assembly as a Democrat to the balance of the unexpired term of the late Andrew Johnson, serving from January 19, 1877 to March 4, 1881.  In the 46th Congress, he was chairman of the Senate Committee on Education and Labor.  His efforts to effect his reelection were unsuccessful, and upon the expiry of his term he returned to the practice of law in Clarksville.

Death 
He died in Clarksville and is buried in that city's Greenwood Cemetery.

References

 Retrieved on 2008-02-13

External links

1822 births
1885 deaths
Democratic Party members of the Tennessee House of Representatives
Confederate States Army officers
Democratic Party United States senators from Tennessee
People from Clarksville, Tennessee
19th-century American politicians